Fourth Avenue is a street in downtown Pittsburgh.

Some of the structures that Fourth Avenue boasts include:
Pittsburgh City County Building (1917)
Allegheny County Office Building (1931)
Grant Building (1932)
River Vue (1957)
Oxford Centre (1983)
PPG Place (1983)

Fourth Avenue also hosts many of the structures of the Fourth Avenue Historic District.

See also
 Fourth Avenue Historic District

References

Streets in Pittsburgh